is a Japanese professional footballer  who plays as a right back for J1 League club Yokohama F. Marinos and the Japan national team.

Career
During his five years-stint with JFA Academy, he was moved from midfield to defence. He was signed by Renofa Yamaguchi in January 2014.

Club statistics
Updated to 14 November 2021.

Honours

Yokohama F. Marinos
 J1 League: 2022

Individual
J.League Best XI: 2022

References

External links
Profile at Kashiwa Reysol
Profile at Renofa Yamaguchi
Profile at Yokohama F. Marinos

1995 births
Living people
Association football people from Tokyo
Japanese footballers
Japanese expatriate footballers
J1 League players
J2 League players
J3 League players
Japan Football League players
Challenger Pro League players
Renofa Yamaguchi FC players
Kashiwa Reysol players
K.S.C. Lokeren Oost-Vlaanderen players
Yokohama F. Marinos players
Japanese expatriate sportspeople in Belgium
Expatriate footballers in Belgium
Association football defenders